Oregon Route 213 (OR 213) is an Oregon state highway that serves the eastern Willamette Valley between Portland and Salem. It is a north–south route. The route (except for its southernmost segment) is known as the Cascade Highway, though specific segments are generally better known by more localized names.

Route description

OR 213 begins on the grounds of Portland International Airport at an intersection with Airport Way, halfway between I-205 and the airport terminal.  It heads south, where it is known as N.E. and S.E. 82nd Avenue, a major five-lane thoroughfare through east Portland, until reaching its other end at OR 224 in the Clackamas area.  Throughout this stretch, OR 213 runs parallel to Interstate 205 and thus mainly serves local traffic.  However, traffic can still be heavy due to incidents on I-205 as well as the street's many businesses.  Also, the street has some of the highest bus ridership in the region, along TriMet Route 72, which connects with the MAX Blue Line at the 82nd Avenue MAX Station.

It then proceeds south on a four-lane expressway through a scenic canyon on Oregon City's eastern edge until it intersects with Molalla Avenue in the vicinity of Clackamas Community College. This route goes by a number of names, known alternately as 82nd Drive, the Oregon City Bypass or the Trails End Highway. It then continues south as a two-lane, undivided route, through the communities of Carus, Mulino, and Liberal. In Liberal, Oregon Route 213 becomes the "Cascade Highway" (formerly Route 215) and continues south. Oregon Route 213 then veers southwest along Silverton Road until it reaches Salem; in Salem it follows an alignment consisting of Silverton Road, Lancaster Drive, and Market Street until its southern terminus at Interstate 5. A separate roadway (never maintained by the Oregon Department of Transportation) known as the Cascade Highway South continues south from Silverton (previously Oregon Route 215 but now devoid of any route number) until an intersection with OR 22 just north of Stayton.

Highways comprising
OR 213 comprises the following named highways (see Oregon highways and routes) from north to south:

The Cascade Highway North No. 68; 
Part of the Clackamas Highway No. 171 (concurrent with OR 224);
Part of the East Portland Freeway No. 64 (concurrent with I-205);
The Cascade Highway South No. 160;
Part of the Hillsboro-Silverton Highway No. 140 (concurrent with OR 214);
Main Street in Silverton;
McClaine Street in Silverton;
Silverton Road in Marion County;
Lancaster Drive in Salem; and
Market Street in Salem.

History

For the most part, the alignment of OR 213 has remained the same over the years; however the following re-alignments have occurred:

 OR 213 used to have a full connection with I-84 prior to the construction of I-205.  Now, one can only enter I-84 headed westbound (towards downtown Portland) or exit I-84 onto OR 213 headed eastbound (coming from Portland). The OR 213 and I-84 intersection is also where OR 213 crosses over the MAX Blue, Red, and Green light rail lines at the Northeast 82nd Avenue station.
 Prior to the construction of the OR 224 Expressway, OR 213 headed south from Sunnyside Road, turned east onto what is currently Sunnybrook, turned again south onto 84th Avenue, proceeded onto what is now Ambler, and continued onto 82nd Drive through Clackamas.
 Prior to the construction of I-205, OR 213 shared an alignment with OR 212 between Clackamas and Oregon City along a local street known as 82nd Drive. It was realigned onto I-205 in 1971.
 Prior to the construction of the Oregon City Bypass in the late 1980s, the highway was routed on an alignment through Oregon City along Washington and 7th Streets and Molalla Avenue.
 In Salem, the highway did not used to connect to I-5 via Lancaster Drive and Market Streets; instead it continued west along Silverton Road (passing under I-5 but with no interchange) until the latter street's intersection with the old OR 99E alignment (Portland Road/Fairgrounds Road)

Major intersections

See also
 List of streets in Portland, Oregon

References

213
Transportation in Marion County, Oregon
Transportation in Clackamas County, Oregon
Transportation in Multnomah County, Oregon
213
Gladstone, Oregon